Lunguda (Nʋngʋra) is a Niger–Congo language of Nigeria. They settle western part of Gongola mainly in and around the hills of the volcanic Lunguda Plateau, Adamawa state. Joseph Greenberg counted it as a distinct branch, G10, of the Adamawa family. When Blench (2008) broke up Adamawa, Lunguda was made a branch of the Bambukic languages.

The current number of speakers is according to Ethnologue cites an SIL figure of 45,000 from 1973. But recent studies has shown 50,000 in the 2006 census.

Variants of the name Longuda include Languda, Longura, Nunguda, Nungura, Nunguraba.

Dialects
In the Adamawa Languages Project website, Kleinewillinghöfer (2014) lists five dialects in the Longuda dialect cluster.

Longuda/Lunguda of Guyuk and Wala Lunguda
Nʋngʋra(ma) of Cerii, Banjiram
Longura(ma) of Thaarʋ (Koola)
Nʋngʋra(ma) of Gwaanda (Nyuwar)
Nʋngʋra(ma) of Deele (Jessu)

Partly due to word taboo customs, there is considerable lexical diversity among Longuda dialects.

Geography 
The Lunguda settle in the northeastern part of Nigeria, mostly in Guyuk, Adamawa state in Guyuk LGA, Balanga LGA of Gombe state and some parts of Borno. They have approximately 504,000 according to 2006 population census.

Names and locations 
Below is a list of language names, populations, and locations from Blench (2019).

The largest ward is Chikila ward.

References

External links
Longuda (Adamawa Languages Project)

Languages of Nigeria
Bambukic languages